Cynthia Henry Thielen (born September 22, 1933) is an American politician who served as a member of the Hawaii House of Representatives representing District 50, the Kailua and Kaneohe Bay areas of Oahu County. A Republican, she served in the state House of Representatives from 1990 until 2020. She served as minority floor leader from 1992 to 1997 and was the assistant minority leader at the time of her retirement.

She was the Republican nominee for United States Senate in 2006, challenging incumbent Democrat Daniel Akaka. She lost to Akaka, 62% to 38%, in the general election.

Political Positions 
Rep. Thielen has described herself as a "progressive Republican" and has been described as a moderate Republican. The American Conservative Union gives Rep. Thielen a 28% rating.

She supports abortion rights. She was supported during her 2006 US Senate campaign by The WISH List, which supports pro-abortion rights Republican women. In her 2018 reelection campaign, she was endorsed by Planned Parenthood's political arm.

In 2013, she was the only Republican in the State House of Hawaii to support same-sex marriage.

Biography
Thielen was born in Los Angeles, California. She attended Stanford University, Case Western Reserve University, and the University of Hawaii, graduating with a degree in law.  She is a founding member of the Law Review.

Thielen retired from her role as a state legislator, opting not to run in the 2020 general election.

See also
 2006 United States Senate election in Hawaii

References

External links

1933 births
21st-century American politicians
21st-century American women politicians
Case Western Reserve University alumni
Living people
Republican Party members of the Hawaii House of Representatives
Politicians from Los Angeles
Stanford University alumni
University of Hawaiʻi alumni
Women state legislators in Hawaii